Barstable may refer to:

Barstable, Essex, a location in the United Kingdom
Barstable (hundred), Essex, England
Barstable School, Basildon, Essex, England

See also
Bastable (disambiguation)
Barnstable (disambiguation)